Carl Sverre Leisegang  (1913-1986) was a senior officer in the South African Army from the artillery. He was a qualified SAAF Pilot. He served as OC Natal Command.

Military career 

Carl Leisegang took part in the Second World War as an Officer Commanding of the Anti Tank Regiment and 4 Field Regiment. He earned a Distinguished Service Order during that war. After the war he was appointed as Commandant School of Artillery and Armour, Officer Commanding 4 Field Regiment for the second time. He commanded Natal Command, Eastern Province & Border Command. His last tour of duty was as Military Advisor to Australia. He died in Durban in 1986.

Awards and decorations

References

1913 births
1986 deaths
Companions of the Distinguished Service Order
South African Army generals
South African military personnel of World War II
Military attachés